Jonny Erik Gunnar Rödlund (born 22 December 1971) is a Swedish former professional footballer who played as a midfielder. A youth player at RSC Anderlecht and Manchester United, he went on to win Allsvenskan and Svenska Cupen with IFK Norrköping before representing teams in Portugal, Germany, and China. A full international between 1990 and 1992, he won two caps for the Sweden national team and represented his country at the 1992 Summer Olympics.

Club career 
Starting his footballing career with Skiljebo SK, Rödlund played youth football at RSC Anderlecht and Manchester United between 1987 and 1989 before signing with IFK Norrköping in 1989. While at Norrköping, he helped the club win the 1989 Allsvenskan and the 1990–91 Svenska Cupen titles. He also represented clubs in Portugal, Germany, and China before retiring at Skiljebo SK in 2007.

In Sweden, due to his youth career both with RSC Anderlecht and Manchester United, he is generally considered as 'the talent that never bloomed'.

International career 
Rödlund won two caps for the Sweden national team in 1990 and 1992. He also represented the Sweden Olympic team at the 1992 Summer Olympics in Barcelona, Spain and scored two goals before Sweden was eliminated in the quarterfinals.

Career statistics

International

Honours
IFK Norrköping
 Allsvenskan: 1989
 Svenska Cupen: 1990–91

References

External links
 

Living people
1971 births
Sportspeople from Västerås
Swedish footballers
Association football midfielders
Sweden international footballers
Sweden youth international footballers
Footballers at the 1992 Summer Olympics
Olympic footballers of Sweden
Västerås SK Fotboll players
R.S.C. Anderlecht players
Manchester United F.C. players
IFK Norrköping players
BK Häcken players
Degerfors IF players
S.C. Braga players
FC Energie Cottbus players
Beijing Guoan F.C. players
Enköpings SK players
Allsvenskan players
Primeira Liga players
Bundesliga players
2. Bundesliga players
Swedish expatriate footballers
Swedish expatriate sportspeople in Belgium
Expatriate footballers in Belgium
Swedish expatriate sportspeople in England
Expatriate footballers in England
Swedish expatriate sportspeople in Portugal
Expatriate footballers in Portugal
Swedish expatriate sportspeople in Germany
Expatriate footballers in Germany
Swedish expatriate sportspeople in China
Expatriate footballers in China